Michigan Hawks was an American women's soccer team that joined the United Soccer Leagues W-League in 2004 as the Detroit Jaguars and renamed to the Michigan Hawks as growth from the larger Michigan Wolves/Hawks organization. The Hawks played in the Midwest Division of the Central Conference. The senior team folded after the 2008 season, though the Hawks youth teams continue to compete in the Elite Clubs National League.

The team played their home games at the stadium on the campus of Livonia-Stevenson High School in the city of Livonia, Michigan. The club's colors was white and black.

Squad 2008

Year-by-year

Honors
 USL W-League Midwest Division Champions 2005, 2006

Notable former players
 Melissa Tancredi

External links
Michigan Wolves/Hawks

Women's soccer clubs in the United States
Soccer clubs in Michigan
Defunct USL W-League (1995–2015) teams
2004 establishments in Michigan
2008 disestablishments in Michigan
Association football clubs established in 2004
Association football clubs disestablished in 2008
Women's sports in Michigan